Wallenda is a 2012 drama film that takes place in the 1920's focusing on Karl Wallenda, who is a high-wire patriarch and how he started off working in the circus.

Plot 
Youthful Wallenda (Marlon Wrede) does everything that it takes to be the best high-wire patriarch, but has moments of doubt and not feeling good enough. Later on in the story, he gains enough courage to take on his destiny of performing on the high-wire with the help of some friends.

Cast 

 Marlon Wrede as Karl Wallenda
 Clement von Franckenstein as Louis Weitzmann
 Sylvianne Chebance as Margareta
 Ed Brigadier as Theater Owner

Production 
VW Scheich directed and wrote this film with Uyen K. Le.

VW Scheich served as a producer for this film.

Wallenda predominantly used a green screen for its scenes.

During the post-production stage, over 300 CG artists, along with VW Scheich, created CG elements and backgrounds for the film.

Gresham Lochner and Kevin Williams are the VFX post producers.

Shawn Hull was the Art Director and Ronnie Cleland was the Lead Texture Artist for this production.

The film was created by the production house named RareForm Pictures.

Release 
Wallenda had its world premiere on Friday, March 23, 2012, at the Cleveland International Film Festival.

The film was released to the public on November 17, 2016, on VOD / Digital release.

Accolades 
Wallenda is a winner of the Golden Crescent Award for best film at the 2012 Charleston International Film Festival.

It was officially selected for the 2012 San Antonio Film Festival.

References

External links 

 
 Wallenda at Rotten Tomatoes

2010s American films
2010s English-language films
2010s German-language films
American drama films
Circus films
The Flying Wallendas